Storage Technology Corporation (StorageTek or STK, earlier STC) was a data storage technology company headquartered in Louisville, Colorado.  New products include data retention systems, which it calls "information lifecycle management" (ILM).

Its remaining product line is now part of Oracle Corporation, and marketed as Oracle StorageTek, with a focus on tape backup equipment and software to manage storage systems.

History 
In 1969 four former IBM engineers—Jesse Aweida, Juan Rodriguez, Thomas S. Kavanagh, and Zoltan Herger—founded the Storage Technology Corporation.  The headquarters was in Louisville, Boulder County, Colorado.

In the 1970s, StorageTek launched its Disk Products division. After a failed attempt to develop an IBM-compatible mainframe, and an optical disk product line, the company filed for Chapter 11 bankruptcy protection in 1984. Starting in 1987, new management invested in an automated tape library product line that "picked" tapes from a silo-like contraption with a robot arm. StorageTek emerged as a dominant player in that market.

StorageTek acquired Documation (1980), Aspen Peripherals Corporation (1989), Network Systems Corporation (1995), and Storability (2005).

Storage Technology Corporation was officially renamed "StorageTek" in 1983.

Sun Microsystems

In June 2005, Sun Microsystems, Inc. announced it would purchase StorageTek for US$4.1 billion in cash, or $37.00 per share. In August 2005, the acquisition was completed.

Oracle
On January 27, 2010, Sun was acquired by Oracle Corporation for US$7.4 billion.  The StorageTek product line was renamed "Oracle StorageTek".

Products 
Disk array: ST9990, ST9985, ST6540, ST6140, Iceberg, IBM RVA, SVA, BradeStor, FLX380, FLX280, FLX240, FLX210, D178, 9176, 9153, 9140, 9130
Disk drives: STK 8000 SuperDisk, STK8350, STK8650, STK N2700 
Fibre Channel, SAS, RAID and SCSI HBAs.
Tape drives: STC 2450, STC 2470, STC 3400, STC 3600, StorageTek 4670, StorageTek 4480, 4490, 9490, SD-3, 9840, T9840B, T9840C, T9840D, T9940, T9940B, T10000A, T10000B, T10000C, T10000D
Tape drives (rebranded): LTO, SDLT, DLT
Tape libraries: 4400, 9310, 9360, 9710, 9714, 9730, 9740, 9738, L20, L40, L80, L180, L700, L700e, L5500, SL500, SL3000, SL8500, SL150, SL4000
Virtual tape libraries: VSM1, VSM2, VSM3, VSM4, VSM5, VSM6
Printer : StorageTek (Documation) 5000

Product timeline 

 1970 - StorageTek releases its first product, the 2450/2470 tape drive.
 1971 - StorageTek introduces the 3400 tape storage device.
 1973 - StorageTek's disk division is founded.
 1974 - StorageTek's first 3600 tape drive ships.
 1975 - StorageTek ships the first 8000 Super Disk and announces the 8350 disk subsystem.
 1978 - StorageTek develops the first solid-state disk.
 1984 - StorageTek develops the first intelligent disk.
 1986 - StorageTek develops the first cached disk.
 1987 - StorageTek develops tape automation and emerges from Chapter 11.
 1994 - StorageTek introduces virtual disk, Iceberg.
 1998 - StorageTek introduces Flexline disk arrays.
 2001 - StorageTek introduces virtual networking.
 2002 - StorageTek introduces BladeStore, a disk array based on ATA disk technology.
 2003 - StorageTek introduces the EchoView data protection appliance, a disk-based appliance that eliminates the backup window.
 2003 - StorageTek introduces the StreamLine SL8500 modular library system.
 2012 - Oracle introduces the Streamline SL150 modular library system.
 2013 - Oracle introduces the T10000D 8.5TB/252Mbit/s tape drive

References

External links
 Oracle StorageTek product website

Computer storage companies
Defunct computer companies of the United States
Hard disk drives
Technology companies based in the San Francisco Bay Area
Companies based in Redwood Shores, California
American companies established in 1969
Computer companies established in 1969
1969 establishments in California
Sun Microsystems acquisitions
Sun Microsystems hardware
Oracle hardware